Alice Theresa Hildagard Swanson Esty (November 8, 1904 – July 21, 2000) was an American actress, soprano and arts patron who commissioned works by members of Les Six and other French composers, and American composers such as Ned Rorem, Virgil Thomson. Claire Brook, and Marc Blitzstein, among others.

Biography

She earned an A.B. degree from Bates College in 1925. She then moved to New York City to study singing and acting. She was hired as an actress with the Group Theater, which was directed by Lee Strasberg and Harold Clurman, and with the Provincetown Players, an avant-garde theater. Her Broadway credits include Come of Age, with Judith Anderson, and L'Aiglon, with Ethel Barrymore.

She married William C. Esty, founder of the William Esty Advertising Agency in the 1930s.

Esty continued her interest in the arts, and she began to commission works by many noted composers, poets, and visual artists. In the late 1950s and early 1960s she spent considerable time in Paris, where she befriended many important composers and artists. Between 1955 and 1969 she regularly commissioned musical compositions, and then performed them in major recital halls, including The Town Hall and Carnegie Recital Hall. If Mrs. Esty's talent as a singer was not perhaps perfect (Ned Rorem referred to her as "a soprano of style and means if not especially of temperament..."), her importance as an arts patron is certainly notable.

Esty lived in Paris frequently in the 1950s and the 1960s and between 1955-1969 she commissioned musical compositions from many French composers including Germaine Tailleferre, Darius Milhaud,  Francis Poulenc, Henri Sauguet and others which she performed in her Town Hall and Carnegie Recital Hall concerts.  In addition, she also commissioned Poulenc's Sonata for Two Pianos for the American piano duo Gold and Fizdale. In 1963, she commissioned works by French and American composers for a special memorial concert for the recently deceased Francis Poulenc, which she performed in Carnegie Recital Hall.

In 1994 and 1995, Mrs. Esty donated the manuscripts for many of her commissioned works to the Library of Bates College where they are located today. Esty died of cancer in New York. The Esty Professorship of Music at Bates was endowed by her.

Partial list of works commissioned by Alice Esty
 Arrieu, Claude, 1903-
 Le Sable du Sablier: Melodies pour chant et piano
 Text: Louise de Vilmorin
 Composed: Undated
 Berkeley, Lennox, Sir,  1903-
 Automne
 Text: Guillaume Apollinaire
 Composed: August 1963
 Soprano and piano
 Berkeley, Lennox, Sir, 1903-
 Five Poems by W. H. Auden
 Text: W. H. Auden
 Composed: 1958
 Soprano and piano
 Bowles, Paul, 1910-
 Roman Suite
 Text: Tennessee Williams
 Composed: 1960
 Soprano and piano
 Bucht, Gunnar, 1927-
 Sex Arstidssanger
 Text: Gunnar Bjorling
 Composed: 1965
 Mezzo-soprano and piano
 Delannoy, Marcel
 La Voix du Silence
 Text: Maurice Carême
 Composed: 1958
 Soprano and piano
 Dutilleux, Henri, 1916-
 San Francisco Night
 Text: Paul Gibson
 Composed: 1963
 Soprano and piano
 published by Éditions Alphonse Leduc, Paris
 Goehr, Alexander, 1932-
 Warngedichte, op. 22
 Text: Erich Fried
 Composed: 1966-1967
 Soprano and piano
 Jones, Charles, 1910-
 Anima
 Text: William Langland
 Composed: 1967-1968
 Soprano, viola, and piano
 Martin, Frank, 1890–1974
 Dedicace
 Text: Robert du la Haye
 Composed: 1945
 Soprano and piano
 Milhaud, Darius, 1892–1974
 L'Amour Chante
 Text: Joachim du Bellay, Marie de France, Alfred de Musset, Louise Labe, Arthur Rimbaud, Pierre de Ronsard, Maurice Sceve, and Paul Verlaine
 Composed: 1964
 Soprano and piano
 Milhaud, Darius, 1892–1974
 Preparatif a la Mort en Allegorique Maritime
 Text: grippa d'Aubigne
 Composed: 1963
 Soprano and piano
 Pinkham, Daniel
 The Song of Jeptha's Daughter
 Text: Robert Hillyer
 Composed: 1963
 Soprano and piano
 Porter, Quincy, 1897–1966
 Seven Songs of Love
 Text: Robert Graves
 Composed: Undated
 Soprano and piano
 Poulenc, Francis, 1899–1963
 Le Travail du Peintre
 Text: Paul Éluard
 Composed: Undated
 Soprano and piano
 Rieti, Vittorio, 1898-
 Plus ne Suis
 Text: Clément Marot
 Composed: 1963
 Soprano and piano
 Rorem, Ned 1923-
 Poulenc
 Text: Frank O'Hara
 Composed: 1963
 Soprano and piano
 Rorem, Ned 1923-
 A Journey
 Text: Andrew Glaze
 Composed: 1976
 Soprano and piano
 Rosenthal, Manuel
 Le Jour d'un Mort
 Text: Paul Gibson
 Composed: 1963
 Soprano and piano
 Sauguet, Henri
 Celui Qui Dort
 Text: Paul Éluard
 Composed: 1963
 Soprano and piano
 Sauget, Henri
 Les Images (from Vie de Campagnes)
 Text: [no information available]
 Composed: Undated
 Soprano and piano
 Sauguet, Henri
 Vie des Campagnes
 Text: Jean Follain
 Composed: 1961
 Soprano and piano
 Tailleferre, Germaine, 1892–1983
 L'Adieu du Cavalier
 Text: Guillaume Apollinaire
 Composed: 1963
 Soprano and piano
 Published by Musik Fabrik, France
 Tailleferre, Germaine, 1892–1983
 Pancarte pour une Porte D'Entree
 Text: Robert Pinget
 Composed: 1959
 Soprano and piano
 Published by Musik Fabrik, France
 Thomson, Virgil, 1896-
 Songs for Alice Esty
 Text: Kenneth Koch
 Composed: 1959
 Soprano and piano
 Thomson, Virgil, 1896-
 Two by Marianne Moore
 Text: Marianne Moore
 Composed: 1963
 Soprano and piano
 Weber, Ben, 1916-
 A Bird Came Down the Walk, op. 57
 Text: Emily Dickinson
 Composed: 1963
 Soprano and piano

References

External links
 The Alice Esty Papers at Bates College

1904 births
2000 deaths
Philanthropists from New York (state)
American sopranos
American stage actresses
20th-century American actresses
Bates College alumni
Singers from New York City
Deaths from cancer in New York (state)
20th-century American singers
20th-century American women singers
20th-century American philanthropists